Emil Aleksander Lindh (15 April 1867 - 3 September 1937) was a Finnish sailor who competed in the 1912 Summer Olympics.

He was a crew member of the Finnish boat Lucky Girl, which won the bronze medal in the 8 metre class.

He was also an actor in minor roles in eight films, including Rautakylän vanha parooni and Murtovarkaus.

References

External links

1867 births
1937 deaths
Finnish male sailors (sport)
Sailors at the 1912 Summer Olympics – 8 Metre
Olympic sailors of Finland
Olympic bronze medalists for Finland
Olympic medalists in sailing
Medalists at the 1912 Summer Olympics